Iris was launched in France in 1794 and came into British hands in 1803, probably by purchase. She became a whaler in the British southern whale fishery. In 1805 she made an unsuccessful attack on a Batavian vessel. Iris was condemned as unseaworthy in late 1805 on her way home after her first voyage as a whaler.

Career
Captain William Clark received a letter of marque on 23 May 1803. Iris appears in the Register of Shipping for 1804 with W. Clark, master, Hurry & Co. owner, and trade Plymouth–Southern Fishery. She also underwritten a good repair in 1803. 

Captain Clark (or Clarke) sailed from England in July, bound for Timor.

Iris intercepted the Batavian near Omba Island and gave chase, though her quarry had more guns and a larger crew. Iris attempted to board the Batavian, but she had too few crew men to prevail. After Clarke was badly wounded Iriss chief office broke off the engagement; the Batavian maintained her cannon fire until Iris was out of range, but chose not to pursue.

Fate
Iris was homeward bound from the southern fishery when she stopped at Saint Helena. There she was condemned in 1805 as unseaworthy. The East Indiaman  took Iriss cargo of oil home.

Citations and references
Citations

References
 

1794 ships
Ships built in France
Age of Sail merchant ships of England
Whaling ships
Maritime incidents in 1805